Diplostigmaty refers, in botany, to the presence of extra stigmas along the style. This condition is known from the genus Sebaea. It is thought to provide reproductive assurance.

References

Botany